The Former British Merchant Warehouse is a historical warehouse in Tamsui District, New Taipei, Taiwan.

History
The area used to be a warehouse to store tea-related products by the British tea merchants. It was then later bought by Shell Oil Company and expanded into four large warehouse and oil tanks. After the bombing by United States in 1944, the warehouse burned for three days and was half destroyed. It was eventually retired as a backup storage since and donated by Shell.

To preserve the historical meaning of the building, the warehouse was repaired. After restoration and remodeling of the area, the Tamsui Cultural Park was established.

Transportation
The area is accessible within walking distance south of Tamsui Station of Taipei Metro.

See also
 List of tourist attractions in Taiwan

References

Buildings and structures in New Taipei
Tourist attractions in New Taipei
British Merchant Warehouse